The People Choice Awards for Favorite Country Artist has been awarded since 2010.The category was split by Favorite Male Country Artist, Favorite Female Country Artist and Favorite Country Group in 2015. The all-time winner in this category is Taylor Swift with 4 wins.

Winners and nominees

Country Artist